Bryan Keith Dauzat (pronounced "dough-zuh"; born November 30, 1959) is an American professional stock car racing driver who competes part-time in the NASCAR Craftsman Truck Series, driving the No. 28 Chevrolet Silverado for FDNY Racing. He has also competed in the ARCA Menards Series and the NASCAR Whelen Modified Tour in the past.

Racing career

ARCA Racing Series
In 2014, Dauzat made his ARCA Racing Series debut at Talladega, finishing 26th. He attempted to qualify for the season-opening race at Daytona the following year but did not make the race. In 2016, Dauzat ran the restrictor plate tracks and qualified but did not start at Kansas. 

For 2017, Dauzat teamed up with Bob Rahilly, owner of former Monster Energy NASCAR Cup Series team RahMoc Enterprises. He also acquired a car from JR Motorsports. He also invited prospect Calvin Carroll to test with the team at Daytona. Dauzat ran a career-high five races in 2017, running Daytona, Talladega, Pocono, Chicagoland and Kansas. He returned to Daytona in 2018 but was caught up in a wreck that also included Bo LeMastus and Quin Houff.

Truck Series
Dauzat made his Camping World Truck Series debut at Bristol in 2014 with FDNY Racing, where he started and finished in the final position of the field, 36th, falling out due to suspension problems. He returned in 2017 to try to qualify for the season-opener at Daytona, but failed to qualify.  In 2018, he returned once again to Daytona, where he finished 18th after being knocked out of the top ten in a late wreck in what was originally intended to be FDNY Racing's final race. However, on August 27, 2018, the team announced on its Facebook that they would run the Truck race at Talladega, and with Dauzat driving, the team achieved its first-ever top-10 finish in 8th place.

During the season-opening 2019 NextEra Energy 250 at Daytona, Dauzat accidentally hit his jackman Billy Rock on pit road when his truck experienced braking problems. Rock was rushed to Halifax Health for his injuries and was diagnosed with a broken shoulder. He was released from the hospital shortly after.

Dauzat returned to FDNY and their No. 28 truck in 2020. He and the team ran more races than originally scheduled because the field size for the Truck Series was expanded from 32 to 40 as a result of the cancellation of qualifying due to the COVID-19 pandemic and the team having owner points to make the races after their attempt at Daytona.

On January 29, 2021, it was revealed that Dauzat would return for another part-time schedule in the FDNY No. 28 truck in 2021, beginning at the season-opener at Daytona. Dauzat entered the CRC Brakleen 150 at Pocono Raceway in June, the 14th race of the season, finishing 34th. Dauzat ran part-time in the FDNY No. 28 truck again in 2022 and will run at least the season-opener at Daytona for the team in 2023.

Personal life
Dauzat serves as president of O. B. Builders, a sponsor of his racing career.

Motorsports career results

NASCAR
(key) (Bold – Pole position awarded by qualifying time. Italics – Pole position earned by points standings or practice time. * – Most laps led.)

Craftsman Truck Series

Whelen Modified Tour

Whelen Southern Modified Tour

 Season still in progress
 Ineligible for series points

ARCA Menards Series

References

External links
 

1959 births
NASCAR drivers
Living people
ARCA Menards Series drivers
Racing drivers from Louisiana
People from Alexandria, Louisiana